
Gryfino County is a unit of territorial administration and local government (powiat) in West Pomeranian Voivodeship, north-western Poland, on the German border. It came into being on January 1, 1999, as a result of the Polish local government reforms passed in 1998.

As of 2006 its total population is 82,813, out of which the population of Gryfino is 21,478, that of Chojna is 7,187, that of Mieszkowice is 3,553, that of Trzcińsko-Zdrój is 2,496, that of Cedynia is 1,653, that of Moryń is 1,570, and the rural population is 44,876.

Neighbouring counties 
Gryfino County is bordered by Police County and the city of Szczecin to the north, Stargard County and Pyrzyce County to the east, and Myślibórz County to the south-east. It also borders Germany to the west.

Administrative division 
The county is subdivided into nine gminas (six urban-rural and three rural). These are listed in the following table, in descending order of population.

References 
 Polish official population figures 2006

 
Gryfino